Charles Hambro, Baron Hambro (24 July 1930 – 7 November 2002) was a British merchant banker and political fundraiser. He was the Chairman of Hambros Bank from 1972 until its merger with Société Générale in 1998. He was the senior honorary treasurer of the Conservative Party from 1993 to 1997.

Early life
Hambro was born on 24 July 1930.

He was an heir to the Hambros Bank. His great-great-grandfather, Carl Joachim Hambro, was an immigrant to England from Denmark who founded the Hambros Bank in 1839. His father was the merchant banker Sir Charles Jocelyn Hambro. His mother, Pamela Cobbold of the East Anglian brewing family, died when he was 21 months old. He grew up at Delcombe Manor in Dorset.

After his mother's death, his stepmother became Dorothy Mackay, who was banker Marcus Wallenberg's ex-wife. During World War II, he was sent to live first with the Wallenbergs in Stockholm and later with the Morgans, another banking dynasty, in New York City. He returned to England in 1943.

He was educated at Eton College, where he played on the cricket team. He then served in the Coldstream Guards for two years.

Career
Hambro started his career at the family business, Hambros Bank, in 1952. He was appointed managing director in 1957, deputy chairman in 1965, and chairman in 1972. He was in charge through interesting but turbulent times, beginning with the stock market and property crash of 1973–74. Hambros was one of the leading banks called in by the Bank of England to launch the financial lifeboat which dealt with the collapse of the Slater Walker empire and generally saved the financial system from collapse. In 1998, Hambros Bank was acquired by Société Générale. It represents its private wealth management subsidiary, SG Private Banking.

From 1987 to 1999, he was on the board of directors of the shipping and distribution group P&O. He was on the boards of the Guardian Royal Exchange Assurance and Taylor Woodrow.

Political activity
Hambro was the senior honorary treasurer of the Conservative Party from 1993 to 1997. He was in charge of replenishing the £19 million overdraft. His efforts were rewarded with a life peerage, created 26 September 1994; he took the title Baron Hambro, of Dixton and Dumbleton in the County of Gloucestershire.

Other roles
He was on the board of trustees of the British Museum from 1984 to 1994.

Personal life
On 4 July 1954, Hambro was married to his first wife, Rose Evelyn Cotterell (1932–2006), the daughter of Sir Richard Cotterell, 5th Baronet and Lady Lettice Lygon. Before their divorce in 1976, they had a daughter and two sons:

 Hon. Clare Evelyn Hambro (b. 1957), who married Eivind Rabben, son of Knut Rabben, in 1989.
 Hon. Charles Edward Hambro (b. 1959), who married Nicole J. Nicholas, daughter of Dr. James A. Nicholas, in 1986. They later divorced.
 Hon. Alexander Robert Hambro (b. 1962), who married Harriet "Hattie" Ward Jones, daughter of David Ward Jones, in 1984. 

In the same year he divorced his first wife, he married his second wife, Cherry Huggins, daughter of Sir John Huggins, a former Governor of Jamaica. She was a divorcee with one daughter, Miranda. He had nine grandchildren: Christiana, Tatiana, Charles, Edward, Alexander, Ben, Marina, Jemima and Sam.

He was the owner of two manors in Gloucestershire: Dixton Manor in Alderton, and Dumbleton Hall in Dumbleton. He organised pheasant shoots on the latter estate. He was a member of the Marylebone Cricket Club. He also gambled at the Bahamian Club in Nassau, Bahamas.

Death
He died on 7 November 2002 in London.

References

External links 
 Hammersley connection – showing connections to the Baring and Hammersley banking families

1930 births
2002 deaths
Bankers from London
People from Dumbleton
People educated at Eton College
Coldstream Guards officers
British corporate directors
Hambro, Charles Hambro, Baron
Conservative Party (UK) officials
British people of Danish descent
British people of German-Jewish descent
Barons of Denmark
Charles
20th-century English businesspeople
Life peers created by Elizabeth II